Pauline Morse is a New Zealand painter, based in Pukerua Bay.

Biography 
Morse's best-known work is a series of bird studies which appeared on a series of definitive stamps first issued between 1985 and 1991.

Morse is also known for her paintings of Pauatahanui, Plimmerton, Pukerua Bay, and Mana Island. Her paintings have been exhibited at many New Zealand art galleries. Morse's career as a painter started in Fiji where she was asked to illustrate Birds of the Fiji Bush by Fergus Clunie and then in 1994 she wrote and illustrated Wild Natives.

References

Living people
New Zealand painters
New Zealand women painters
New Zealand stamp designers
People from Porirua
Pukerua Bay Residents
Year of birth missing (living people)